"Open Up Your Door" is the first single by the American band, Richard and the Young Lions, composed by professional songwriters Larry Brown, aka L. Russell Brown, Ray Bloodworth, and Neval Nader, and released on July 1966 on Philips Records (see 1966 in music). It was the only nationally charting recording by the group, and it also reached the top five in multiple regional markets.

Brown and Bloodworth decided to record with the group in spring-1966, after they showed promise in an invitation to a jam session. The band was signed to Philips, partially completing the song, with the intention of finishing the whole process after touring and promoting in the Northeast. Richard and the Young Lions returned to provide lead vocals and backing vocals. Along with singer Howie "Richard" Tepp's gritty vocals, "Open Up Your Door" was also marked by the first recorded instance of African hair drum and fuzz-toned bass guitar.

"Open Up Your Door" was released as a single in July 1966, and it managed to reach number 99 on the Billboard Hot 100, until it dropped off in a week, as well as reaching number 91 on Record World Top 100 Pops and number 70 on Cash Box magazine Top 100. The song was much more successful on a regional level, where it charted in the top five in every market where it was released. The single peaked at #1 in Detroit, Cleveland, and Salt Lake City, and #2 in Seattle and Vancouver. "Open Up Your Door" was later included in the 1998 reissue of the compilation album, Nuggets: Original Artyfacts from the First Psychedelic Era, 1965–1968.

Cover versions 
The Invaders, a punk group featuring the original singer from The Sonics, recorded a cover version of "Open up Your Door" (retitled "Open up Yer Door") in 1979. The Romantics, a hit pop group from the 1980s, recorded the same song, which appeared on their album, In Heat, and on two of their live albums. "Open Up Your Door" has also been covered by; Bill Kennedy's Showtime, The Raving Mojos, The Demolition Doll Rods, The Flakes, The Goldstars, The Hunchmen, The Stance, and The Future Primitives. And their song, "You Can Make It" was covered by Las Membranas.

References

1966 singles
1966 songs
Philips Records singles
Song recordings produced by Bob Crewe